You'll Find Out is a 1940 American comedy film directed by David Butler and starring Kay Kyser. In 1940, the film was nominated for an Academy Award for Best Original Song ("I'd Know You Anywhere") at the 13th Academy Awards. In the film, members of an orchestra hired to play at a young heiress's birthday party uncover a plot against her. The film was very popular and made a profit of $167,000.

Plot
After Kay Kyser and his orchestra arrive at the castle-shaped mansion, the drawbridge leading to it is mysteriously dynamited, stranding both entertainers and guests.

Kyser is suspicious of mystic Prince Saliano, and for good reason. He is taking advantage of the heiress' Aunt Bellacrest's belief in spiritualism to swindle the estate out of large sums of money. Saliano has been "planted" in the house by the "respectable" family attorney, Judge Mainwaring. Also in on the swindle is Professor Fenninger, who claims to be an expert on uncovering phony spiritualists (something
he has no real intention of doing).

After a series of typical "haunted house" jokes, Kyser uncovers a basement "command center" that provides the special effects for Saliano's phony seances.

The three criminals attempt to escape using dynamite as a shield. But a friendly dog retrieves the lit stick and returns it to the criminals. There is a loud explosion, and the dog returns carrying Saliano's turban.

Cast

See also
 Boris Karloff filmography
 Bela Lugosi filmography

References

External links
 
 
 
 

1940 films
1940 comedy films
American comedy films
American black-and-white films
1940s English-language films
Films directed by David Butler
Films scored by Roy Webb
RKO Pictures films
1940s American films